The Dacia Duster Concept is the first concept car of the Romanian car manufacturer Dacia, produced in 2009.

Overview
This crossover was presented at the 2009 Geneva International Motor Show, and foreshadowed the future Dacia Duster SUV marketed from 2010.

Designed in collaboration by the Renault Design Central Europe studio in Bucharest and Renault's Technocentre in Paris, the Duster is a crossover coupe with three doors, one on the driver's side and two doors on the passenger's side, including a rear-hinged "suicide" door.

It measures  in length and is powered by the Renault-Nissan 1.5 dCi diesel engine making . The concept features an adaptable interior, with the passenger seat sliding under the driver's seat, allowing for a large 2 meter long cargo space. The Duster also comes with a tailgated box structure that can slide out from behind the car, creating an additional pickup cargo bed.

See also
 Automobile Dacia
 Dacia Duster
 Dacia Duster II

References

External links

  Official Dacia website

Duster
Concept cars
Crossover sport utility vehicles
Duster Concept